Independence Public Library (IPL) is a small public library that has stood in the same location for more than 100 years, in Independence, Kansas. Today the library serves over thirteen thousand local residents and works in partnership with several other Kansas libraries and agencies. Its  motto is "creating possibilities, changing lives."

History
IPL traces its roots back to 1882 when the Ladies Library Association of Independence was tasked with finding and securing books for a small library.  That goal came to fruition on December 1 of that year, when the group opened a library in the City Council room in City Hall and lined the one bookshelf with 94 books purchased for $94.25.  Over the next twelve years, the Association grew the collection, moving every few years until the Association began talks with the Mayor to open a full-time home for the library. Those discussions resulted in the city agreeing to match the building funds obtained by the Association, which included a $22,500 Carnegie grant. In 1907 the library was finally opened to the public,  and was then named the Carnegie Independence Public Library, located at 5th and Maple, where it still stands today.

Over the years the facility has been redesigned, redecorated, and re-energized, and now stands at 13,500 square feet.

In 2009 the library faced dramatic budget cuts and possible closure. After significant changes instituted  by library administrators, the library experienced remarkable recovery, and in 2012 was given the Best Small Library in America Award, cosponsored by the Library Journal and the Bill & Melinda Gates Foundation.

Library holdings
From fiction to anime, mystery, history, and large print, IPL's shelves cover a wide range of subject matter and formats. Patrons can also find DVDs, video games, computers, eReaders, puzzles, microfilm readers, printers, scanners, and a nearly complete set of yearbooks from Independence High School dating back to 1911.   The library is also a member of SEKnFind, a 41-member consortium of Southeast Kansas Libraries, allowing for a robust inter-library loan program.

Services
IPL is dedicated to creating and maintaining a solid connection with the public. Toward that end, the library has employed many tools, including an ongoing social media campaign, and several active Facebook pages for different interest groups.  Programming is often held in the Library's Kansas Room and includes workshops in beginning computing, genealogy, knitting, creative writing, book discussions, and more.  There is also a Library Book Store, located on the second floor of the Library, an active Children's Library, and a Teens Space.

References

External links
 Independence Public Library

Public libraries in Kansas
Carnegie libraries in Kansas
Independence, Kansas